The 2001–02 season was the 87th season of the Isthmian League, which is an English football competition featuring semi-professional and amateur clubs from London, East and South East England. 

The league consisted of four divisions for the last season. At the end of it single Division One was divided into Division One North and Division One South, most of the clubs in Division Two were promoted to the newly created divisions. Division Three was disbanded after all the clubs were promoted to divisions One North, One South and to Division Two.

Premier Division

The Premier Division consisted of 22 clubs, including 18 clubs from the previous season and four new clubs:
 Bedford Town, promoted as runners-up in Division One
 Boreham Wood, promoted as champions of Division One
 Braintree Town, promoted as third in Division One
 Kingstonian, relegated from the Football Conference

Gravesend & Northfleet won the division and were promoted to the Football Conference. Canvey Island finished second for a second season in a row. At the end of the season the Premier Division was expanded up to 24 clubs, so only one club were to relegate this season.

League table

Stadia and locations

Division One

Division One consisted of 22 clubs, including 16 clubs from the previous season and six new clubs:

Three clubs relegated from the Premier Division:
 Carshalton Athletic
 Dulwich Hamlet
 Slough Town

Three clubs promoted from Division Two:
 Barking
 Tooting & Mitcham United
 Windsor & Eton

At the end of the previous season Barking ceased to exist when they merged with East Ham United to form Barking & East Ham United, taken place of Barking in Division One.

Ford United won the division and were promoted to the Premier Division along with Bishop's Stortford and Aylesbury United. At the end of the season Division One was replaced by divisions One North and South, remaining clubs were distributed between newly created divisions. There was no relegation from Division One this season.

League table

Stadia and locations

Division Two

Division Two consisted of 22 clubs, including 16 clubs from the previous season and six new clubs:

Three clubs relegated from Division One:
 Barton Rovers
 Leatherhead
 Romford

Three clubs promoted from Division Three:
 Arlesey Town
 Ashford Town
 Lewes

Lewes won the division at the first attempt. At the end of the season most of Division Two clubs were transferred to the newly created divisions One. Their places were taken by clubs from disbanded Division Three.

League table

Stadia and locations

Division Three

Division Three consisted of 22 clubs, including 19 clubs from the previous season and three clubs relegated from Division Two:
 Edgware Town
 Leighton Town
 Wokingham Town

Croydon Athletic won the division and were promoted two tiers up along with eight other clubs. At the end of the season Division Three was disbanded due to creation of divisions One, clubs were distributed between newly created divisions.

League table

Stadia and locations

See also
Isthmian League
2001–02 Northern Premier League
2001–02 Southern Football League

References

External links
Official website

Isthmian League seasons
6